Tanjil may refer to:

 Tanjil Bren, a town in Victoria, Australia
 Tanjil River, Victoria, Australia
 County of Tanjil, Victoria, Australia
 Tanjil Alam, professional dancer and choreographer from Bangladesh

See also